Fox Sports Asia (formerly ESPN Star Sports) was a pan-Asian pay television network broadcasting in Asia, operated by Fox Networks Group Asia Pacific, a subsidiary of The Walt Disney Company (Southeast Asia) Pte. Ltd. It also oversaw a version of Star Sports available in Mainland China and South Korea.

Originally launched in early 1990s as Star Sports (earlier Prime Sports) and ESPN by Satellite Television Asian Region (STAR TV) and ESPN International respectively, both parties agreed to combine their operations in Asia in October 1996. News Corporation took the full control of the venture in 2012, and relaunched the channels in two phases in January 2013 and August 2014, respectively.

History

Early years

Star Sports
Star Sports was first launched on 21 August 1991 as Prime Sports (體育台) with the very launching programme including tennis such as New York City US Open Tennis as very first programme. It was an 24-hour multi-sport television channel broadcasting in English and Chinese. STAR TV, based in Hong Kong, operated the channel in partnership with TCI in the United States, which owned Prime-branded regional sports channels there. The channel was broadcast across the continent of Asia, reaching from the Far East to the Middle East, as with AsiaSat 1's footprint. STAR TV have since regionalised the channel to serve its huge viewerships.

ESPN
ESPN was originally a part of the so-called "Gang of Five", which was a consortium that was set up to compete against STAR TV in the region. (The others in the group were CNN International, HBO, TVB [with TVB Superchannel] and the Australian Broadcasting Corporation [with Australia Television International]) The consortium's channels were initially transmitted via Palapa satellite, but were later also added to Apstar satellite.

Operations combined as ESPN Star Sports

ESPN and Star Sports were competing with each other across Asia, but their businesses were making loss. In October 1996, both channels agreed to combine their operations in the region. The resulting joint venture, later named ESPN Star Sports, was to be headquartered in Singapore (where ESPN's operations in Asia had been based).

On 16 January 1998, a version of Fox Sports was launched in the Middle East, as carried by Star Select. This apparently replaced ESPN STAR Sports in the region, but the pan-Asian version was available via the AsiaSat and Palapa satellites.

Relaunch as Fox Sports
On 6 June 2012, it was announced that News Corporation would buy ESPN International's share in ESPN Star Sports. Later, Star India took over ESPN Star Sports' businesses in India, and relaunched all of its sports channels under the Star Sports brand on 6 November 2013.

In October 2012, Fox Football Channel was launched in Malaysia. The channel ceased transmission in 2015.

On 28 January 2013, ESPN and ESPN HD was relaunched as Fox Sports and Fox Sports Plus HD in Hong Kong, Taiwan and Southeast Asia. The regional version of ESPNews was relaunched as Fox Sports News, and SportsCenter Asia was relaunched as Fox Sports Central.

On 15 August 2014, Star Sports was rebranded as Fox Sports 2, and Fox Sports Plus HD was renamed Fox Sports 3 (or Fox Sports HD in Vietnam). The corresponding HD and SD versions of all three channels were also launched.

The relaunch of ESPN Star Sports as Fox Sports did not affect much of East Asia, as a version of Star Sports broadcast to Mainland China and South Korea kept the brand, and instead, the version of ESPN for Mainland China was renamed as Star Sports 2 on 10 January 2014.

ESPN International has since refocused on its digital business building out online properties for football (ESPNFC), cricket (CricInfo), Formula 1 (ESPNF1), and Australian rugby union (ESPNscrum), and established partnership with Multi Screen Media in India (Sony ESPN TV channel until 31 March 2020), TV5 Network in the Philippines (ESPN5 programming division until 13 October 2021), Tencent in Mainland China (a dedicated ESPN section at qq.com), and Mediacorp in Singapore (local ad sales only for the ESPN website through its Partner Network division).

On 31 March 2020, the website of Fox Sports Asia merged into and redirected to global version of ESPN website, remained unaffected for Fox Sports Asia socials.

On March 8, 2021, Fox Sports partnered with Emtek's OTT media service Vidio to make the networks available for Indonesian viewers.

Closure

On September 18, 2020, Disney announced that it would shut down Fox Sports operations in Taiwan at end of 2020. It was later revealed that operations in Taiwan would end on January 1, 2021, following years on losing money in the region.

On April 27, 2021, Disney announced that the Fox Sports network, along with the rest of Fox channels, would close down for good on October 1 after 30 years of broadcasting, folding the former Prime Sports/Star Sports Asia and ESPN Asia channel spaces, as they shift their focus to the latter streaming platform Disney+ (or Disney+ Hotstar for Indonesia, Malaysia and Thailand; although the launch in Vietnam was currently unknown). The last event covered by the channel was the Formula One 2021 Russian Grand Prix, 2021 Superbike World Championship at Circuito de Jerez and UFC 266: Volkanovski vs. Ortega.

Prior to the shutdown, Korean sports network SPOTV brought the licensee to cover up the remaining 2021 MotoGP World Championship, taking over the Fox Sports network once their transmission goes offline, resuming the remaining MotoGP races. They also carried Superbike World Championship as well.

Hong Kong pay TV provider Now TV picked up the coverage of 2021 US Open along with the remaining races of the 2021 Formula One World Championship and future UFC fights, prior to the closure of the Fox Sports network.

The remaining coverage of both Formula One and UFC was aired on Malaysia Astro for Astro SuperSport 5, which has been launched post-closure; Philippines Premier Sports from the TAP Sports network, which also replaced Fox Sports post-closure; Singapore StarHub TV and Singtel TV, for Hub Sports & Mio Sports respectively and even Thailand TrueVisions' True Sport. Mola streamed the remaining UFC fights in Indonesia while also carrying the sub-license to both Singapore & Malaysia for future Live fights with the inclusion of Dana White's Contender Series that hadn't been aired when Fox Sports mainly aired the UFC main events, meanwhile the Emtek group aired the remaining Formula One races for their Champions TV network along with their OTT media service Vidio which previously carried the Fox Sports network to the service.

As reported exclusively from SportBusiness, the Formula One coverage in Hong Kong and Southeast Asia (excluding Vietnam, in which K+ owned the rights following the closure of the channel) has been transferred over to beIN Sports starting from 2023, which also carried both Australian Open and Roland-Garros tennis rights (except in Vietnam, which was shared between K+ and VTVcab), awhile SPOTV, which already available across Southeast Asia excluding Vietnam, will broadcast Wimbledon and the US Open. Awhile the extension for UFC coverage in Southeast Asia was yet to be finalized as their contracts set to be expired by early 2023.

The John Dykes Show was announced to be resumed on Disney+ Hotstar in Malaysia, Indonesia & Thailand, then yet-to-be announced for other Disney+ territories including Singapore and Hong Kong as Star Originals.

A few days after its closure, Disney relaunched the ESPN brand in Asia but as a digital media portal through its official YouTube channel and social media pages.

Channels

 Fox Sports (formerly ESPN)
 Fox Sports 2 (formerly Prime Sports and Star Sports)
 Fox Sports 3 (formerly ESPN HD and Fox Sports Plus HD)
  (formerly ESPNews): The channel was first launched as ESPNews in November 2009 in Singapore on Singtel's Mio TV, and later expanded to other areas, including Hong Kong, where it was launched in August 2011 on PCCW's Now TV. The channel was renamed as Fox Sports News on 28 January 2013. The channel was gradually discontinued in 2017: It ceased broadcasting on 1 April 2017 in most areas, but continued until 24 April in Hong Kong, 3 May in Malaysia, and 31 May in Taiwan.
 : The channel was launched in October 2012 in Malaysia. Its programming was mainly consisted of association football matches and shows. It ceased broadcasting in 2015.

Regions
The individual regional variations of Fox Sports channels include:
 Hong Kong: Additionally, a schedule variant is offered to Hong Kong Cable Television customers due to broadcasting rights issues. This variant which was transmitted by Fox Networks Group Hong Kong and produced from the studios in Hong Kong. The headquarter closed on October 1, 2021.
 Indonesia: This variant which was transmitted by Fox Networks Group Indonesia and produced from the studios in Indonesia. The headquarter closed on November 12, 2021.
 Malaysia and Brunei: This variant does not provide coverage of field hockey events. This variant which was transmitted by Fox Networks Group Malaysia and produced from the studios in Malaysia. The headquarter closed on November 12, 2021.
 Philippines: This variant which was transmitted by Fox Networks Group Philippines and produced from the studios in Philippines. The headquarter closed on October 1, 2021.
 Singapore: This variant which was transmitted by Fox Networks Group Singapore and produced from the studios in Singapore. The headquarter closed on November 12, 2021.
 Vietnam: This variant which was transmitted by Fox Networks Group Vietnam and produced from the studios in Vietnam. The headquarter closed on October 1, 2021, in Hanoi and November 12, 2021, in Hồ Chí Minh City.
 Taiwan: This variant which was transmitted by Fox Networks Group Taiwan and produced from the studios in Taipei. The headquarter will be closed on January __ 2024.

It also overseed a version of Star Sports broadcast to Mainland China and South Korea, and Star Sports 2 (formerly known as ESPN until 31 December 2014) broadcast to Mainland China.

In South Korea, Fox Sports was partnered with JTBC until 11 March 2020, which operated JTBC3 Fox Sports (now known as JTBC Golf&Sports). As ESPN Star Sports, it has previously partnered with MBC (MBC ESPN (now known as MBC Sports+)) from 2001 until July 2010, and SBS (SBS ESPN (now known as SBS Sports)) from Late 2010 until 2014.

Final programming
Broadcast rights for various sports properties contain territorial limitations and in a lot of instances, the rights indicated below may not pertain to all Asian territories in which Fox Sports operated.

Australian Rules Football
 Australian Football League (except Philippines)

Boxing
 World Boxing Matches

Cricket 

 ICC
 Cricket World Cup (all matches available on official website and Fox+, highlights on television)
 Under-19 Cricket World Cup (all matches available on Fox+, highlights and live coverage of final on television)
 Women's Cricket World Cup (all matches only available on Fox+, highlights on television)
 Anthony de Mello Trophy
 Border–Gavaskar Trophy.
 Sri Lanka T20  matches

Football
 AFC (only for Brunei, Malaysia, and Singapore through 2024)
 AFF Suzuki Cup (only for Brunei, Indonesia and Malaysia; Indonesian broadcast was later moved to RCTI, iNews, MNC Sports and Soccer Channel)
 Danish Super League (one match per week, 2019–2021 (originally from June 2020 with the remaining matches in 2019–20))
 FC Copenhagen (first week of the month)
 Brøndby IF (second week of the month)
 FC Midtjylland (third week of the month)
 Aarhus GF (fourth week of the month)
 DBU Pokalen
 A-League (only for Guam, Mongolia, Northern Marianas and Palau)

Field Hockey
Men's FIH Pro League (except Brunei, Malaysia, and Singapore)
Women's FIH Pro League (except Brunei, Malaysia, and Singapore)

Golf
 The Masters Tournament
 U.S. Open Championship
 The Open Championship
 PGA Championship 
 ANA Inspiration
 United States Women's Open Championship (golf)
 Women's PGA Championship 
 Ricoh Women's British Open
 The Evian Championship

Kickboxing
 Kunlun Fight

Mixed Martial Arts
 Ultimate Fighting Championship (The rest of the 2021 Championship has been aired on Mola along with some other broadcasters including Indonesia antv and tvOne)

Motorsports
 Formula One (The rest of the 2021 Championships has been aired on other broadcasters including Indonesia Champions TV/O Channel/Moji, Malaysia Astro SuperSport and Singapore Starhub TV/Singtel TV)
 FIA Formula 2 Championship
 FIA Formula 3 Championship
 MotoGP (The rest of the 2021 Championships has been aired on SPOTV along with some other broadcasters including Indonesia Trans7)
 Moto2
 Moto3
 MotoE
 IndyCar Series (general broadcast in CANAL+ Vietnam)
 Superbike World Championship
 WeatherTech SportsCar Championship
 Extreme E
 FIM Motocross World Championship
 Supercars Championship
 Australian Superbike Championship
 Australian Motocross Championship
 World Touring Car Cup (only for highlights)
 FIA World Endurance Championship (only for highlights)
 MotoAmerica (2020–2021)

Rugby

Union 
 Global Rapid Rugby

League 
 National Rugby League (only for Brunei, Malaysia, and Singapore)

Tennis
 Australian Open (The broadcast has been aired on other broadcasters)
 French Open (The broadcast has been aired on other broadcasters)
 Wimbledon (The broadcast has been aired on other broadcasters)
 U.S. Open (The broadcast has been aired on other broadcasters)
 ATP Cup
 Fed Cup (final only)
 Laver Cup

News
 SportsCenter Asia
 ESPN FC

Other
 The G.O.A.T. (only for the Philippines)
 Full Throttle (only for the Philippines)
 76 Rider (only for Indonesia)
 Special Force 2 Pro League
 Fox Sports Live (pre/post match/game/race shows)
 2 Wheels
 Chequered Flag
 The John Dykes Show
 Sport Confidential
 International Motorsports News
 Gilette World of Sports
 Football Asia

Personalities
John Dykes
Colette Wong
Paula Malai Ali
Yvette King
Jason de la Peña
Steve Dawson
Edward Russell
Alex Yoong
Matteo Guerinoni
Matthew Marsh
Jazeman Jaafar
Marlon Stöckinger

See also
 Fox Sports (United States)
 Star Sports (Indian TV network)

References

External links

Sports television in Indonesia
Defunct television channels
Sports television in Malaysia
Sports television in Singapore
Sports television in the Philippines
Television stations in Taiwan
Cable television in Hong Kong
Mass media in Southeast Asia
Southeast Asia
ESPN media outlets
Prime Sports
Star Sports
Television channels and stations established in 1991
Television channels and stations disestablished in 2021
Former subsidiaries of The Walt Disney Company